The U.S. Post Office is a historic building in Leland, Mississippi, USA.

Location
The building is located at 204 North Broad Street in Leland, a small town in Washington County, Mississippi, in the Southern United States.

History
The building was completed in 1938. It was designed in the Colonial Revival architectural style. In 1940, Stuart R. Purser painted a mural inside the building.

Architectural significance
It has been listed on the National Register of Historic Places since April 21, 1983.

References

Colonial Revival architecture in Mississippi
Government buildings completed in 1938
Post office buildings on the National Register of Historic Places in Mississippi
National Register of Historic Places in Washington County, Mississippi
1938 establishments in Mississippi